Chlosyne theona, the theona checkerspot, is a species checkerspots in the  butterfly family Nymphalidae  found in North America.  The MONA or Hodges number for C. theona is 4508.

Subspecies
These three subspecies belong to the species C. theona:
 C. t. bolli (W. H. Edwards, 1877) i
 C. t. chinatiensis (Tinkham, 1944) i b (chinati checkerspot)
 C. t. thekla (W. H. Edwards, 1870) i
Data sources: i = ITIS, c = Catalogue of Life, g = GBIF, b = Bugguide.net

References

Further reading

External links

 

theona
Articles created by Qbugbot